Fort Ritner is an unincorporated community in Guthrie Township, Lawrence County, Indiana.

History
Fort Ritner was platted in 1857. It was named for Michael Ritner, a railroad employee who oversaw construction on the nearby tunnel.

Geography

References

Unincorporated communities in Lawrence County, Indiana
Unincorporated communities in Indiana
1857 establishments in Indiana